The 2016 Kumho Tyres Australian V8 Touring Car Series is the 9th running of the series. Defending champion Liam McAdam moved to the V8 Supercars Dunlop Series for 2016.

Team and drivers

Race calendar
The series is being contested over five rounds with three races at each round.

Series standings

References

External links
 

Kumho Tyres Australian V8 Touring Car Series
V8 Touring Car Series